{{DISPLAYTITLE:C14H13N3O5S}}
The molecular formula C14H13N3O5S (molar mass: 335.335 g/mol, exact mass: 335.0576 u) may refer to:

 Isoxicam
 Sulfanitran

Molecular formulas